Nairn Street is a  street in Fremantle, Western Australia. The  street runs parallel to High Street and is part of the Fremantle West End Heritage area, which was established in late 2016.

Nairn Street is named after Major William Nairn (1767 – 1853), who served in the 46th (South Devonshire) Regiment of Foot.

References

Streets in Fremantle